Yu-Foo Yee Shoon (born 17 February 1950) is a former Singaporean politician. A member of the country's governing People's Action Party (PAP), she served as a Member of Parliament (MP) from 1984 to 2011. Her political appointments included Mayor of South West District of Singapore and Minister of State at the Ministry of Community Development, Youth and Sports.

Political career 
Yu-Foo was first elected to Parliament in the 1984 general election. She was then one of only three female Members of Parliament at the time (and she went on to become one of the longest serving women politicians in Singapore).

In June 1999, Yu-Foo was appointed Senior Parliamentary Secretary at the Ministry of Community Development and Sports (MCDS).

In November 2001, Yu-Foo was appointed Mayor of the Bukit Timah Community Development Council (CDC), which subsequently expanded to become the South West CDC. With her appointment, she became the first woman Mayor in Singapore.

In August 2004, Yu-Foo was appointed Minister of State at the Ministry of Community Development, Youth and Sports (MCYS).

At the 2011 general election, Yu-Foo retired from politics after serving six terms in Parliament. She was succeeded as Minister of State at the MCYS by Halimah Yacob on 21 May 2011.

Career outside politics 
Yu-Foo started her career as a Senior Industrial Relations Officer with the National Trade Union Congress (NTUC) soon after graduating from university. Over the years, she has been Chairman, Vice-President, Assistant Secretary-General and Deputy Secretary-General of the NTUC.

Her other appointments have included: 
 Member of the Professional Advisory Council of NTUC Childcare Co-operative Ltd
 Chairman of the Board of Trustees of the Singapore National Co-operative Federation (SNCF)
 First woman to chair the NTUC Central Co-operative Fund Committee (CCFC)

She has also served as a board member of several statutory boards, co-operatives and listed companies such as:

 Singapore Economic Development Board (EDB)
 Singapore Telecommunications
 NTUC Insurance Co-operative (INCOME)
 NTUC FairPrice
 NTUC Childcare
 National Environment Agency (NEA)
 Jurong Town Corporation (JTC)
 People's Association (PA)

Achievements and accolades 
Named "Woman of the Year" in 1995 by Her World magazine, Yu-Foo was awarded the Rochdale Medal by the Singapore National Co-operative Federation in 1997.

In 2005, she received the Alumni Achievement Award from the Nanyang Technological University.

In May 2008, she was conferred the Honorary Degree of Doctor of Education by Wheelock College, Boston, USA.

The Singapore Council of Women's Organisations (SCWO) inducted her to its Wall of Fame in 2009.

Education 
Yu-Foo attended Nanyang Girls' High School from 1962 to 1967, and graduated from Nanyang University in 1971 with a Bachelor of Commerce. In 1996, she completed a Master of Business at the Nanyang Technological Institute.

Family background 
Yu-Foo was born in Singapore in 1950. Her father, Foo Tuck Sun, was a Hainanese immigrant who served as principal of Pei Chun Public School from the 1940s until his retirement in 1971, and her maiden name is Fu. She is married to Yu Lee Wu, an engineering lecturer. The couple have three children.

References

Members of the Parliament of Singapore
People's Action Party politicians
Singaporean women in politics
Singaporean politicians of Chinese descent
Hainanese people
1950 births
Living people
Nanyang University alumni
Singaporean trade unionists